Cape Kannon may refer to the following capes in Japan:
 Cape Kannon (Kanagawa, Japan), a cape in Yokosuka, Kanagawa
 , a cape in Nanao, Ishikawa